The enzyme purine imidazole-ring cyclase (EC 4.3.2.4) catalyzes the chemical reaction

DNA 4,6-diamino-5-formamidopyrimidine  DNA adenine + H2O

This enzyme belongs to the family of lyases, specifically amidine lyases.  The systematic name of this enzyme class is DNA-4,6-diamino-5-formamidopyrimidine C8-N9-lyase (cyclizing DNA-adenine-forming). Other names in common use include DNA-4,6-diamino-5-formamidopyrimidine 8-C,9-N-lyase (cyclizing), DNA-4,6-diamino-5-formamidopyrimidine 8-C,9-N-lyase (cyclizing, DNA-adenine-forming).

References

 

EC 4.3.2
Enzymes of unknown structure